Events from the year 1726 in Scotland.

Incumbents 
 Secretary of State for Scotland: vacant

Law officers 
 Lord Advocate – Duncan Forbes
 Solicitor General for Scotland – John Sinclair, jointly with Charles Erskine

Judiciary 
 Lord President of the Court of Session – Lord North Berwick
 Lord Justice General – Lord Ilay
 Lord Justice Clerk – Lord Grange

Events 
 25 May – Britain's first circulating library is opened in Edinburgh by poet and bookseller Allan Ramsay.
 23 June – professional Irish swordsman Andrew Bryan is defeated in a public duel in Edinburgh by 62-year-old Killiecrankie veteran Donald Bane "to the great joy of the Edinburgh citizenry".
 General George Wade begins an 11-year program of road improvement and bridge building in Scotland.
 A faculty of medicine is formally established at the University of Edinburgh, a predecessor of the University of Edinburgh Medical School. John Rutherford becomes Professor of Practice of Medicine.

Births 
 17 January – Hugh Mercer, soldier and physician (died 1777 of wounds received at the Battle of Princeton)
 6 February – Patrick Russell, surgeon and herpetologist (died 1805 in London)
 3 June – James Hutton, geologist (died 1797)
 26 September – John H. D. Anderson, scientist (died 1796)
 Andrew Bell, engraver, co-founder of the Encyclopædia Britannica (died 1809)
 Thomas Melvill, natural philosopher (died 1753)

Deaths 
 8 July – John Ker, spy (born 1673)
 August – Colonel John Stewart (of Livingstone), former Member of Parliament for the Kirkcudbright Stewartry, killed by Sir Gilbert Eliott, 3rd Baronet, of Stobs
 Robert Dundas, Lord Arniston, judge

The arts
 James Thomson begins publication of his poem cycle The Seasons with "Winter".

See also 
 1726 in Great Britain

References 

 
Years of the 18th century in Scotland